Puebla de Yeltes is a village and municipality in the province of Salamanca,  western Spain, part of the autonomous community of Castile-Leon.

Geography

Economy
The basis of the economy is agriculture.

Culture
List of municipalities in Salamanca

References

Municipalities in the Province of Salamanca